Bradley Michael Staubitz (born July 28, 1984) is a former Canadian ice hockey forward who is currently an assistant coach for Sarnia Sting in the Ontario Hockey League

Playing career
Staubitz was born in Edmonton, Alberta and raised in Sarnia, Ontario. He played his junior career as a defenceman and was converted to the wing at the pro level.

Undrafted, Staubitz signed as a free agent with the San Jose Sharks to a three-year entry level contract on September 18, 2005. Staubitz made his NHL debut for the Sharks during the 2008–09 season and recorded a fighting major on his first career shift against the Anaheim Ducks on October 17, 2008. On February 18, 2009, Staubitz was recalled from the AHL's Worcester Sharks.

He played in 47 games for San Jose in 2009–10 recording a career high 6 points. On June 21, 2010 he was traded to the Minnesota Wild for a fifth-round pick in the 2010 NHL Entry Draft. He was then signed to a two-year contract by the Wild on June 22.

On September 24, 2011, Staubitz was suspended for 7 games (4 preseason, 3 regular) by the NHL for illegally checking Cody Bass from behind during a pre-season game.

Staubitz was put on waivers on February 10, 2012. He cleared waivers the next day, and was assigned to the Houston Aeros of the American Hockey League, the Wild's minor league affiliate. On February 27, 2012, the Montreal Canadiens claimed Staubitz off re-entry waivers.

On July 1, 2012, he signed a two-year contract with the Anaheim Ducks.

On November 16, 2013, Staubitz was traded by the Ducks along with Peter Holland to the Toronto Maple Leafs in exchange for Jesse Blacker and two 2014 NHL Entry Draft picks. He was immediately reassigned to their minor league team, the Toronto Marlies of the American Hockey League.

As a free agent into the 2014–15 season, Staubitz with limited North American interest, opted to sign his first European contract with German DEL2 club, EV Landshut on October 22, 2014.
At the conclusion of the season he opted to retire and coach for the Sarnia Sting of the Ontario Hockey League.

Career statistics

References

External links

1984 births
Living people
Anaheim Ducks players
Canadian ice hockey right wingers
Cleveland Barons (2001–2006) players
EV Landshut players
Minnesota Wild players
Montreal Canadiens players
Norfolk Admirals players
Ottawa 67's players
San Jose Sharks players
Sault Ste. Marie Greyhounds players
Ice hockey people from Edmonton
Toronto Marlies players
Undrafted National Hockey League players
Worcester Sharks players
Canadian expatriate ice hockey players in Germany